Events from the year 1908 in art.

Events
 January 20 – Hugh Lane opens the Dublin City Gallery, the world's first to display only modern art.
 February – The Ashcan School ("the Eight") give their first and only exhibition, opening at the Macbeth Gallery in New York.
 March 20–May 2 – Salon des Indépendants in Paris gives rise to the term "Cubism" (cubisme).
 May – Sergey Prokudin-Gorsky produces a color photographic portrait of Leo Tolstoy.
 July – Allied Artists' Association holds its first exhibition, at the Royal Albert Hall in London.
 July 29 – The Whitworth Art Gallery building in Manchester (England) is formally opened.
 Autumn – Edvard Munch suffers a nervous breakdown and enters a clinic in Copenhagen.
 November – Georges Braque exhibits at Daniel-Henry Kahnweiler's Paris gallery; critic Louis Vauxcelles describes him as "reducing everything... to geometric schemas, to cubes."
 Paul Ranson founds the Académie Ranson in Paris.
 The British Medical Association Building, London, designed by Charles Holden with eighteen controversial nude sculptures by Jacob Epstein, is completed.
 Wassily Kandinsky settles in the Bavarian town of Murnau am Staffelsee and begins a series of paintings inspired by the local landscape.
 The Academy of Fine Arts Vienna rejects (for the second time) Adolf Hitler's application to study painting.
 Australian painter Arthur Streeton marries violinist Nora Clench.

Works

 George Bellows – Steaming Streets
 László Beszédes – Joseph (slave) (sculpture)
 Pierre Bonnard – Woman in a Blue Hat
 Constantin Brâncuși
 The Kiss (sculpture)
 The Wisdom of the Earth (wood sculpture)
 Georges Braque – Le Viaduc de L'Estaque
 Mikalojus Konstantinas Čiurlionis
 Fantasy (triptych)
 Prelude and Fugue (diptych )
 Sonatas
 Sonata of the Pyramids
 Sonata of the Sea
 Sonata of the Serpent
 Sonata of the Summer
 Sonata of the Stars
 Henri-Edmond Cross – Cypresses at Cagnes
 Roger de La Fresnaye - Allée des Acacias in the Bois de Boulogne
 André Derain – Landscape in Provence
 Herbert James Draper – The Water Nymph
 John Duncan – Helene Schlapp – Iona
 Thomas Eakins – William Rush and His Model (two versions)
Daniel Chester French – Statue of George Frisbie Hoar
 Florence Fuller – Portrait of Deborah Vernon Hackett (approximate date)
 J. W. Godward
 A Classical Lady
 A Grecian Girl
 Ismenia
 Erich Heckel – Weisses Haus in Dangast
 Lewis Hine – Girl Worker in a Carolina Cotton Mill (photograph)
 Ernst Ludwig Kirchner – Street, Dresden
 Gustav Klimt – The Kiss
 Laura Knight – The Beach
 Carl Larsson – Gustav Vasas intåg i Stockholm 1523 (Nationalmuseum)
 Henri Matisse
 Bathers with a Turtle
 The Dessert: Harmony in Red ("The Red Room")
 Game of Bowls
 Portrait of Greta Moll
 Amedeo Modigliani – The Jewess
 Piet Mondrian – Avond
 Claude Monet – paintings of Venice
 The Doge's Palace Seen from San Giorgio Maggiore
 Le Grand Canal
 Le Grand Canal et Santa Maria della Salute
 Palace From Molo, Venice San Giorgio Maggiore at Dusk Mikhail Nesterov – Portrait of B. M. Nesterov William Ordway Partridge – Statue of Alexander Hamilton (sculpture, New York City)
 Pierre-Auguste Renoir – Portrait of Ambroise Vollard Otto Schumann – Lewis and Clark Memorial Column (Portland, Oregon)
 Carl Seffner – Statue of Johann Sebastian Bach (outside St. Thomas Church, Leipzig)
 Walter Sickert – The Camden Town Murder (group of paintings)
 Marianne Stokes – Madonna and Child Pedro Subercaseaux
 Cabildo abierto del 22 de mayo de 1810 Mariano Moreno en su mesa de trabajo Sydney Curnow Vosper – Salem J. W. Waterhouse – Gather Ye Rosebuds While Ye MayBirths
January to June
 January 18 – Humberto Rosa, painter (d. 1982)
 February 12 – Jean Effel, French painter, caricaturist, illustrator and journalist (d. 1948)
 February 26 – Tex Avery, American animator, cartoonist, and director (d. 1980).
 February 28 – William Coldstream, English realist painter (d. 1987).
 February 29 – Balthus, French modern artist (d. 2001)
 March 13
 Rita Angus, New Zealand painter (d. 1970)
 Maria Helena Vieira da Silva, Portuguese-French abstract painter (d. 1992)
 March 19 – George Rodger, English photographer (d. 1995)
 March 23 – Cecil Collins, English painter and printmaker (d. 1989)
 May 9 – Mary Scheier, American sculptor and academic (d. 2007)
 May 16 – Anne Bonnet, Belgian painter (d. 1960)
 June 24 – Helen Lundeberg, painter (d. 1999)

July to December
 July 6 – Sam Vanni, Finnish painter (d. 1992) 
 July 8 – Kaii Higashiyama, Japanese painter and writer (d. 1999)  
 July 9 – Minor White, American photographer (d. 1976).
 July 22 – Claire Falkenstein, American sculptor and painter (d. 1997).
 August 22 – Henri Cartier-Bresson, French photographer (d. 2004).
 August 28
 Edith Tudor Hart, born Edith Suschitzky, Austrian-born photojournalist and communist agent in Britain (d. 1973).
 Roger Tory Peterson, American naturalist, ornithologist, artist and educator (d. 1996).
 August 30 – Leonor Fini, Argentine-born surrealist painter (d. 1996).
 September 6 – Korczak Ziolkowski, Polish American sculptor (d. 1982).
 September 14 – Peter Watson, English arts benefactor (k. 1956)
 October 1 – Nicholas Marsicano, American painter (d. 1991).
 October 21 – Jorge Oteiza, Spanish sculptor, painter, designer and writer (d. 2003).
 October 27 – Lee Krasner, American abstract expressionist painter (d. 1984).
 November 4 – EQ Nicholson, born Elsie Q. Myers, English textile designer and painter (d. 1992).
 November 19 – Gisèle Freund, born Gisela Freund, German-born photographer (d. 2000).
 December 3 – Victor Pasmore, English artist and architect (d. 1998).
 December 23 – Yousuf Karsh, Armenian-Canadian photographer (d. 2002).

Full date unknown
 Madiha Omar, Iraqi artist (d. 2005)
 Myron Stout, American abstract painter (d. 1987)
 Umaña, Colombian artist (d. 1994).

Deaths
 January 9 – Wilhelm Busch, German humorist, poet, illustrator and painter (born 1832)
 January 13 – Hashimoto Gahō, Japanese painter of the Kanō school (b. 1835)
 January 19 – Roberto Bompiani, Italian painter and sculptor (b. 1821)
 January 28 – Sidney Paget, British illustrator (b. 1860)
 April 13 – Aasta Hansteen, Norwegian painter, writer, and early feminist (b. 1824)
 June 1 – Allen Butler Talcott, American painter (b. 1867)
 July 17 - Joseph Henderson, Scottish landscape painter (b. 1832)
 August 30 – Giovanni Fattori, Italian painter and printmaker (b. 1825)
 November 3 – Harro Magnussen, German sculptor (born 1861)
 November 4 – Richard Gerstl, Austrian painter and draughtsman (b. 1883)
 November 24 – Charles Henry Turner, American watercolourist and oil painter (b. 1848)
 December 5 – Ernest Hébert, French painter (b. 1817)
 December 27 – František Bohumír Zvěřina, Czech painter (b. 1835)
 date unknown''
 Leopoldo Costoli, Italian sculptor (b. 1850)
 George Earl, British painter of sporting animals (b. 1824)

References

 
Years of the 20th century in art
1900s in art